The Upaon-Açu/Miritiba/Alto Preguiças Environmental Protection Area is an environmental protection area in the state of Maranhão, Brazil

Location

The Upaon-Açu/Miritiba/Alto Preguiças Environmental Protection Area (APA) covers all or part of the municipalities of Urbano Santos (2.8%), São Luís (1.4%), São José de Ribamar (2.25%), São Benedito do Rio Preto (0.34%), Santo Amaro do Maranhão (5.87%), Santana do Maranhão (0.03%), Santa Rita (1.85%), Santa Quitéria do Maranhão (3.91%), Rosário (4.26%), Raposa (0.41%), Primeira Cruz (7.89%), Presidente Vargas (0.29%), Presidente Juscelino (2.2%), Paço do Lumiar (0.55%), Nina Rodrigues (0.05%), Morros (10.8%), Itapecuru Mirim (0.18%), Icatu (9.24%), Humberto de Campos (13.59%), Cachoeira Grande (4.32%), Belágua (3.18%), Barreirinhas (12.07%), Bacabeira (0.79%) and Axixá (1.3%) in the state of Maranhão.

It adjoins the Lençóis Maranhenses National Park to the north and the Delta do Parnaíba Environmental Protection Area to the east.

History

The Upaon-Açu/Miritiba/Alto Preguiças Environmental Protection Area was created by decree 12.428 of 5 June 1992 with objectives that included controlling use and occupation of the land, exploitation of natural resources, hunting and fishing, protection of fauna and flora, and maintenance of water quality.
A 2011 report noted that the APA was not the target of ongoing public policies to protect its ecosystems.
The management plan was completed in October 2014, allowing the Secretary of State for Environment and Natural Resources (Sema) to start conservation measures.
At that time there was still no managing board.

Environment

The APA contains elements of the Amazon rainforest (18%),  cerrado (63%) and coastal marine (19%) biomes.
Vegetation includes pioneer formations (47%), dense rainforest (7%), savanna-seasonal forest contact (1%). savanna-mixed rainforest contact (1%) and savanna-semi-desert-seasonal forest contact  (25%).
The APA is a birthplace and nursery for most species of coastal elasmobranchii, so deserves special care in management of fishing.

Notes

Sources

Environmental protection areas of Brazil
Protected areas established in 1992
1992 establishments in Brazil
Protected areas of Maranhão